Domingo Pilarte (born January 5, 1990) is an American mixed martial artist who competed in the Bantamweight division of the Ultimate Fighting Championship.

Mixed martial arts career

Early career
Starting his professional career in 2009, Pilarte compiled a 7–1 record fighting out of promotions in the Houston area, culminating with Pilarte winning a razor thin split decision to current UFC bantamweight Adrian Yanez at LFA 7.

Pilarte faced Vince Morales on July 17, 2018 at Dana White's Contender Series 13. He won the fight via technical submission with a rear-naked choke and secured a contract with the UFC.

Ultimate Fighting Championship
Pilarte was scheduled to face Brian Kelleher on November 3, 2018 at UFC 230. Pilarte was forced to withdraw from the bout, citing an injury.

Pilarte made his UFC debut against Felipe Colares on July 20, 2019 at UFC on ESPN: dos Anjos vs. Edwards. He lost the fight via split decision.

Pilarte next faced Journey Newson at UFC 247 on February 8, 2020. He lost the fight via TKO within the first minute of the fight. However, on March 25, it was announced by the Texas Department of Licensing and Regulation (TDLR) that Journey Newson tested positive for marijuana in in-competition drug tests. The fight was subsequently overturned to a no contest.

Pilarte faced Brian Kelleher on August 21, 2021 at UFC on ESPN: Cannonier vs. Gastelum. He lost the fight via unanimous decision.

On February 10, 2022, it was announced that Pilarte was released by the UFC.

Mixed martial arts record

|-
| Loss
| align=center|8–3 (1)
| Brian Kelleher
| Decision (unanimous)
| UFC on ESPN: Cannonier vs. Gastelum
| 
| align=center|3
| align=center|5:00
| Las Vegas, Nevada, United States
|
|-
| NC
| align=center|8–2 (1)
| Journey Newson
| NC (overturned)
| UFC 247
| 
| align=center|1
| align=center|0:38
| Houston, Texas, United States
|
|-
| Loss
| align=center|8–2
| Felipe Colares
|Decision (split)
|UFC on ESPN: dos Anjos vs. Edwards
|
|align=center|3
|align=center|5:00
|San Antonio, Texas, United States
|
|-
| Win
| align=center|8–1
| Vince Morales
|Technical Submission (rear-naked choke)
|Dana White's Contender Series 13
|
|align=center|2
|align=center|1:52
|Las Vegas, Nevada, United States
| 
|-
| Win
| align=center|7–1
| Adrian Yanez
|Decision (split)
|LFA 7
|
| align=center|3
| align=center|5:00
|Houston, Texas, United States
| 
|-
| Win
| align=center|6–1
| Chris Pham
|KO (punch)
| Legacy FC 59
| 
| align=center|1
| align=center|0:38
| Houston, Texas, United States
|
|-
| Win
| align=center|5–1
|Javier Obregon
|Submission (armbar)
|Fury FC 8
|
|align=center|1
|align=center|2:04
|Humble, Texas, United States
|
|-
| Win
| align=center|4–1
|Joel Scott
|Decision (split)
|Fury FC 4
|
|align=center|3
|align=center|5:00
|Humble, Texas, United States
|
|-
| Loss
| align=center|3–1
| Caio Machado
|Decision (unanimous)
| Legacy FC 27
|
|align=center|3
|align=center|5:00
|Houston, Texas, United States
|
|-
| Win
| align=center|3–0
| Ricardo Delgado
|KO (punch)
| Legacy FC 15
|
| align=center|1
| align=center|1:51
|Houston, Texas, United States
|
|-
| Win
| align=center|2–0
| Gerzan Chaw
| Submission (armbar)
|International Xtreme Fight Association
|
| align=center|2
| align=center|1:56
|Houston, Texas, United States
|
|-
| Win
| align=center|1–0
| Adolfo Ortega
| Submission (armbar)
|Art of War: Mano A Mano
|
|align=center|1
|align=center|0:46
|Mesquite, Texas, United States
|

See also 
 List of current UFC fighters
 List of male mixed martial artists

References

External links 
  
  

1990 births
Living people
American male mixed martial artists
Bantamweight mixed martial artists
Ultimate Fighting Championship male fighters